This is a list of Manipuri feature films certified by Central Board of Film Certification (CBFC) and released in 2018.

Some of them made entries in the prestigious national and international film festivals of 2018 and 2019 and had won awards. Magi Matambakta and Laman Ama are such films. A few films certified in 2018 were released in the year 2019 and hence tagged as 2019 films.

January–March

April–June

July–September

October–December

References

Cinema of Manipur
Lists of 2018 films by country or language
2018 in Indian cinema
Lists of Indian films
Meitei language-related lists
 2018